Kalian-e Olya (also Romanized as Kālīān-e ‘Olyā, and Kālyān-e ‘Olyā; also known as Kāleyān-e Bālā, Kālīān, Kāliān Bālā, and Kālīān-e Bālā) is a village in Poshtdarband Rural District, in the Central District of Kermanshah County, Kermanshah Province, Iran. At the 2006 census, its population was 210, in 41 families.

References 

Populated places in Kermanshah County